Penn 1 (originally One Penn Plaza and stylized as PENN 1) is a skyscraper in New York City, located between 33rd Street and 34th Street, west of Seventh Avenue, and adjacent to Pennsylvania Station and Madison Square Garden. It is the tallest building in the Pennsylvania Plaza complex of office buildings, hotels, and entertainment facilities.

The building is assigned its own ZIP Code, 10119; it was one of 41 buildings in Manhattan that had their own ZIP Codes .

Architecture 
The skyscraper was designed by Kahn & Jacobs and completed in 1972. It reaches  with 57 floors. The tower has three setbacks: at the 7th, 14th, and 55th floors. From its location on the west side of Manhattan, most south, west and north-facing tenants have unobstructed views of the Hudson River. One Penn Plaza is built with structural steel and concrete, with grey solar glass and anodized aluminum on the outside walls. Mechanical rooms are located on the 12th and 13th floors; placing these on lower floors instead of the top of the building allowed equipment to be installed before the structural steel framework was complete and shaved six to nine months off the building's construction schedule.

The building has 14 entrances and 44 elevators in seven banks. An underground parking garage provides 695 spaces for cars and is accessible from both 33rd and 34th Streets. Direct passageways at each end of the building provide underground connections to the Long Island Rail Road concourse of Pennsylvania Station, which is located one block to the south.

A public plaza and fountain are located on the west end of the building. Unlike traditional fountains, steam is dispensed in the winter and fog is dispensed in the summer to prevent water from splashing out during gusty wind conditions.

History
One Penn Plaza is currently owned by Vornado Realty Trust. It was previously owned by Helmsley-Spear Inc., which sold the building for $420 million in the late 1990s.

In 2009, plans were made to install a cogeneration plant in order to heat the building more efficiently. By 2010, it was reported that when the new plant was activated, it cut the building's carbon output nearly in half. The lobby was refurbished in 1995 and underwent another refurbishment in 2019. The building had been rebranded as Penn 1 by 2021. A restaurant called The Landing opened on the second floor of the rebranded Penn 1 in 2022.

More than 80 percent of the action in the 2011 independent film Margin Call was shot on the 42nd floor of the building, which had recently been vacated by a trading firm.

Tenants 
Cisco Systems, a networking and telephony company, occupies part of the 6th and the entire 9th floor.
Cookie Jar Entertainment has an office in Suite 3324.
Dun & Bradstreet has an office on the 44th floor.
Expeditors has a office on the 46th floor.
Gibbons P.C., a law firm, occupies the entire 37th floor.
Insight Enterprises has offices on the 19th floor.
Lumen Technologies has an office on the 51st floor
MarkLogic, an enterprise NoSQL software vendor, has a suite of offices on the 42nd floor.
Mitel Networks, a telecommunications provider, occupies a suite of offices on the 25th floor.
Polycom, a telecommunications equipment manufacturer, occupies the 48th floor.
Riverbed Technology occupies a suite of offices on the 17th floor.
URS Corporation New York City Office occupies most of the 6th and 7th floors of One Penn Plaza.
WSP USA, formerly Parsons Brinckerhoff, is headquartered in One Penn Plaza and occupies the 4th and 5th floors.
DBI Consultants occupies the 3rd floor.

Additionally, Publicis formerly occupied the fifth floor and part of the fourth floor.

See also 
List of tallest buildings in New York City

References

External links

 

34th Street (Manhattan)
Leadership in Energy and Environmental Design certified buildings
Office buildings completed in 1972
Pennsylvania Plaza
Privately owned public spaces
Skyscraper office buildings in Manhattan
1972 establishments in New York City